SUMO-activating enzyme subunit 1 is a protein that in humans is encoded by the SAE1 gene.

Interactions 

SAE1 has been shown to interact with SAE2, the protein product of the gene UBA2.

References

Further reading

External links